Elymas , also known as Bar-Jesus, is a Jew described in the Acts of the Apostles, chapter 13, in the New Testament. He is referred to as a mágos, which the King James Bible translates as "sorcerer."

In the Bible 
In Acts 13, Paul the Apostle and Barnabas travel to the city of Paphos in Cyprus, where the Roman Proconsul, Sergius Paulus, wishes to hear them speak about Jesus. Elymas, described as a false prophet and a sorcerer, opposes them, whereupon Paul (who is here referred to for the first time by his Roman name) announces that God intends to make Elymas temporarily blind. A cloud of darkness immediately begins blocking his sight; after this, Sergius Paulus is converted to Christianity.

According to The Golden Legend, Elymas later stirred up a riot of Jews and pagans in Salamina (Salamis) against Barnabas, resulting in his death.

Name 
Acts 13:8 says, "Elymas the mágos (for so his name is translated) opposed them". "Elymas" is possibly derived from the Arabic ‘alīm "learned" or "wise", and may be used to translate mágos. Bar-Jesus means "Son of Joshua" or "Son of Jesus" in Aramaic.

Cultural influence
"Elymas the Sorcerer Struck with Blindness" is the title of a famous cartoon by Raphael, which served as the inspiration for woven tapestries in the Vatican.

See also 
 Apollonius of Tyana
 Jesus of Nazareth
 John the Baptist
 Simon Magus

References 

1st-century Jews
1st-century Romans
Ancient occultists
Magic (supernatural)
People from Paphos
People in Acts of the Apostles
Prophets
Roman Cyprus
European witchcraft
Asian witchcraft